The 1944 Minnesota lieutenant gubernatorial election took place on November 7, 1944. Republican Party of Minnesota candidate C. Elmer Anderson defeated Minnesota Democratic-Farmer-Labor Party challenger Frank Murphy.

Results

External links
 Election Returns

Lieutenant Gubernatorial
1944

Minnesota